Thomas Holbrook (born 1949) is an Illinois politician who serves as the St. Clair County Clerk. He was appointed to replace Bob Delaney. Prior to this he served as Chairman of the Illinois Pollution Control Board from 2011 to 2013 and a Democratic member of the Illinois House of Representatives representing the 113th District for eight terms from 1995 until 2011.

References

External links
Illinois General Assembly - Representative Thomas Holbrook (D) 113th District official IL House website
Bills Committees
Project Vote Smart - Representative Thomas A. 'Tom' Holbrook (IL) profile
Follow the Money - Thomas (Tom) Holbrook
2006 2004 2002 2000 1998 1996 campaign contributions
Illinois House Democrats - Thomas Holbrook profile

1949 births
Living people
Democratic Party members of the Illinois House of Representatives
Politicians from St. Louis
Southern Illinois University Edwardsville alumni
21st-century American politicians
County clerks in Illinois
County board members in Illinois